Raelene Castle  (born 30 September 1970) is a sports executive who has worked in Australia and New Zealand. She was chief executive officer of Rugby Australia from 2017 to 2020, before becoming chief executive officer of Sport New Zealand.

Early life and family
Castle was born in Wagga Wagga, New South Wales, Australia, on 30 September 1970, the daughter of Bruce and Marlene Castle. Both of her parents represented New Zealand internationally in sports: her father as a rugby league footballer and her mother as a lawn bowler. The family returned to New Zealand when Castle was six months old.

Career
From 2007 to 2013, Castle was the chief executive officer (CEO) of Netball New Zealand. In 2013, she was appointed CEO of Canterbury-Bankstown Bulldogs, becoming the first female CEO of a club in the National Rugby League. At the end of the 2017 season, she was replaced by Rugby League World Cup boss Andrew Hill.

In December 2017, Castle was appointed as CEO of Rugby Australia, and served in that role until her resignation in April 2020. This acknowledged a great contribution to Australian Rugby notably changing the yellow shade on the Wallabies sports colours to improve the actual on field performance and outcomes. In December 2020, Castle took up a role as CEO of Sport New Zealand following contract work on Sport New Zealand's Strengthen and Adapt project.

Honours
In the 2015 New Year Honours, Castle was appointed an Officer of the New Zealand Order of Merit, for services to sport and business.

References

1970 births
Living people
Australian sports executives and administrators
New Zealand sports executives and administrators
New Zealand rugby league administrators
Officers of the New Zealand Order of Merit
People from Wagga Wagga
Australian women chief executives
New Zealand women chief executives
New Zealand netball administrators